Elections to Brentwood Borough Council were held on 2 May 2002.  The entire council was up for election following boundary changes. The Liberal Democrats retained control of the council for a twelfth   year.

Election result

Ward results

External links 
 Brentwood Council

2002
2002 English local elections
2000s in Essex